The 1980–81 Edmonton Oilers season was the Oilers' second season in the NHL, and they finished with 74 points, a 5-point improvement from their 1st season.

Wayne Gretzky ran away with the Art Ross Trophy, awarded to the leading scorer, as he finished with 164 points, 29 points ahead of runner-up Marcel Dionne of the Los Angeles Kings. Gretzky also won his second consecutive Hart Memorial Trophy, awarded to the MVP of the NHL. His 164 points were an NHL record, previously held by Phil Esposito of the Boston Bruins in the 1970–71 NHL season when he scored 152 points.  Youngsters Jari Kurri and Mark Messier have very good offensive seasons, finishing 2nd and 3rd on the Oilers scoring list.

Eddie Mio got the majority of action in the Oilers goal, playing in a team high 43 games and having 16 wins, which set a franchise record.

In the playoffs, the Oilers faced the heavily favoured Montreal Canadiens in the first round, and they shocked the hockey world by sweeping Montreal in 3 games. In the quarter-finals, the Oilers played the defending Stanley Cup Champion and heavily favored New York Islanders and took them to 6 games before being eliminated.

Season standings

Schedule and results

Playoffs
In Game One of the series versus Montreal, Wayne Gretzky had five assists. This was a single game playoff record.

Season stats

Scoring leaders

Goaltending

Playoff stats

Scoring leaders

Goaltending

Awards and records

Records 
164: A NHL record for most points in a single season by Wayne Gretzky.
153: A new NHL record for most points in a single season by Wayne Gretzky on March 29, 1981.
109: A NHL record for most assists in a single season by Wayne Gretzky.
103: A new NHL record for most assists in a single season by Wayne Gretzky on April 1, 1981.

Milestones

Transactions

Trades

Free agents

*Played only one game before becoming a free agent

Draft picks
Edmonton's draft picks at the 1980 NHL Entry Draft

References

National Hockey League Guide & Record Book 2007

Edmonton Oilers season, 1980-81
Edmon
Edmonton Oilers seasons